The 1971–72 Washington State Cougars men's basketball team represented Washington State University for the 1971–72 NCAA college basketball season. Led by first-year head coach Bob Greenwood, the Cougars were members of the Pacific-8 Conference and played their home games on campus at Bohler Gymnasium in Pullman, Washington.

Hired in July to succeed Marv Harshman, Greenwood was an assistant at Iowa for a year and before that the head coach at Washington University in St. Louis; he resigned from WSU in mid-March, after just one season. Assistant coach Dale Brown became the head coach at LSU a week later, and freshman coach Homer Drew went with him to Baton Rouge.

George Raveling, an assistant at Maryland under Lefty Driesell, was hired by WSU athletic director Ray Nagel a few weeks later in April, and led the Cougar program for eleven years.

References

External links
Sports Reference – Washington State Cougars: 1971–72 basketball season

Washington State Cougars men's basketball seasons
Washington State Cougars
Washington State
Washington State